Graužiai could refer to several Lithuanian villages:
Graužiai, Gudžiūnai, in Gudžiūnai Eldership of Kėdainiai District Municipality
 Graužiai, Josvainiai, in Josvainiai Eldership of Kėdainiai District Municipality
 Graužiai, Kunioniai, a smaller village nearby Kunioniai in Josvainiai Eldership of Kėdainiai District Municipality
 Graužiai, Širvintos, in Širvintos District Municipality.

See also 
 Graužai